Farm Africa is a UK-based charitable organization set up in 1985 that works with farmers, pastoralists and forest communities in eastern Africa.  The charity promotes sustainable agricultural practices, strengthens markets and protects the environment in rural Africa. Farm Africa has offices in the United Kingdom, Kenya, Tanzania, Ethiopia and Uganda.

Farm Africa was founded in 1985 by Sir Michael Wood (1918-1987), a doctor who had co-founded the African Medical and Research Foundation (Amref), and David Campbell, an agriculturalist.  Campbell served as executive director until 1999, when he was succeeded by Dr Christie Peacock, who joined the charity in 1988.  The charity's Chief Executive is Dan Collison, its Chair is John Reizenstein and its President is Sir Martin Wood, brother of the co-founder.

Locations 
The charity works in the following locations:
 Kenya
 Meru County
 Isiolo
 Mwingi
 Kitui
 Marsabit
 Moyale
 Kakamega
 Busia County
 Homa Bay
 Siaya County
 Vihiga County
 Trans-Nzoia County
 Embu County
 Ethiopia
 Debub Omo Zone
 Bonga Forest
 Chilimo
 Borena Zone
 South Omo Zone
 Bale Zone
 South Wollo Zone
 Oromia Zone
 Benishangul-Gumuz
 Tanzania
 Babati
 Mbulu
 Hanang
 Dodoma
 Uganda
 Mbale
 Sironko
 Kanungu District
 Lira District
 Karamoja
 Democratic Republic of the Congo
 Virunga National Park

External links 
Farm Africa's website

References 

Development charities based in the United Kingdom
Organizations established in 1985
1985 establishments in the United Kingdom
Rural development in Africa